The Woodberry Nunataks are a group of small nunataks  north of Lucas Nunatak in the Casey Range of the Framnes Mountains in Antarctica. They were mapped by Norwegian cartographers from air photos taken by the Lars Christensen Expedition of 1936-37 and visited by an ANARE (Australian National Antarctic Research Expedition) party in 1962. The nunataks were named for B.D. Woodberry, an ionospheric physicist at Mawson Station and a member of the field party.

Nunataks of Mac. Robertson Land